SRRT may refer to:

Serrate RNA effector molecule homolog
Subaru Road Racing Team
Social Responsibilities Round Table
the Russian Special Rapid Response Team or SOBR